The Bush School is the only independent private K–12 school in Seattle, Washington. Founded in 1924 by Helen Taylor Bush, The Bush School today enrolls 580 students. As of 2020, school review website Niche ranks the Bush School as the best private K-12 school in Washington state and the 4th best private prep and high school in the Washington state.

History 

In 1924, Helen Taylor Bush, a supporter of John Dewey's philosophy of progressive education, opened a preschool and kindergarten in her home to six students. In 1929, the school, having grown to six grades, the school was organized as a nonprofit corporation with a board of trustees. The Helen Bush School for Girls formally began in 1930.

In 1941, Bush helped organize the Pacific Northwest Association of Independent Schools, now called NWAIS.

Gracemont became part of the Bush School campus in 1944. The house itself, plus the carriage house and the grounds, were transferred to Mrs. Bush by Grace Heffernan Arnold. Gracemont continues to serve as a classroom and administrative building for the Upper School.

In 1968 the boarding program was phased out.

The school was formally renamed the Bush School in 1970 and began enrolling boys in the Upper School, making it Seattle's only K–12 coeducational independent school.

In 1986, the Bush School completed two capital campaigns that dated back to 1972 resulting in a faculty endowment, renovations to its Gracemont building, and construction of the Commons, a new gym, an art building, administrative offices, Benaroya, and the urban courtyard.

Construction of the Lower Campus including the Lower School classrooms, Community Room, library, Mag Gym, turf field, play structure, and the parking structure was completed in 2006.

In 2016, The Bush School acquired a second campus, called the Bush Methow Campus, in Mazama, WA. The twenty-acre campus and educational facility, formerly known as the North Cascades Basecamp, integrates wilderness, cultural, and academic experiential learning.

School traditions 

Inquiry-based and experiential learning is a longstanding tradition of the Bush School, which is manifested in field trips for students in each of the school's divisions, as well as international travel and wilderness outings for older students. Winter sports also are a focus of its experiential learning program, and the school holds a mountaineering class at Snoqualmie Pass and also a winter sports wilderness program including snowshoeing, ice skating, cross-country skiing, snow hiking and learning about winter wildlife. The school also encourages students to explore cultural, natural and historical sites.

Notable alumni
 Chris Ballew (1983), member of the band the Presidents of the United States of America
 Dave Dederer (1982), member of the band the Presidents of the United States of America
 Meg Greenfield, political editorial writer
 Risa Lavizzo-Mourey, president and CEO of the Robert Wood Johnson Foundation
 Bonnie McKee (2002), songwriter
 Sweet Water, American rock band

References

Educational institutions established in 1924
High schools in King County, Washington
Private elementary schools in Washington (state)
Private high schools in Washington (state)
Private middle schools in Washington (state)
Schools in Seattle
1924 establishments in Washington (state)